Taurus Three, Taurus 3, Taurus III, or variation, may refer to:

 "Taurus 3" (song), a 1983 song by Mike Oldenfield off the album Crises (album)
 Moog Taurus III, a music synthesizer
 Bristol Taurus III, a radial aircraft engine
 Ford Taurus generation three, a passenger sedan car

See also

 Taurus (disambiguation)